The Language of Music is a 1959 book about music by the critic and musician Deryck Cooke.

Reception
Robert M. Wallace reviewed The Language of Music in The Nation.

The Language of Music is an often cited representative of the expressionist theory of art. No systematic experimental study of Cooke's theory has emerged relating it to musical education, but one pilot study showed that for 22 non-musician students, his characterizations of musical phrases were not experienced. The philosopher Douglas Hofstadter writes that The Language of Music is, "A valuable start down what is sure to be a long hard road to understanding music and the human mind."

References

Bibliography
Books

 
 
 

Journals

  

1959 non-fiction books
Books by Deryck Cooke
English-language books
Music books